HVGC-1 is the first discovered hypervelocity globular cluster. Discovered in 2014, it was found escaping the supergiant elliptical galaxy Messier 87, in the Virgo Cluster. It is one of thousands of globular clusters found in M87. It is the first hypervelocity star cluster so far discovered. The globular is located at decimal degrees (RA, DEC) (187.72791°, +12.68295°).

Properties
In relation to M87, its velocity was determined to be –. The cluster's velocity is so high that it will escape the Virgo Cluster as well.

The cluster's velocity is thought to originate by being ejected by the supermassive black hole at the center of M87, when the black hole stripped the outer layers of HVGC-1 off, it also ejected the remaining core with greater than escape velocity.

References

Globular clusters
Messier 87
Virgo Cluster
Virgo (constellation)